Newville may refer to:

Places
Canada
 Newville, Newfoundland and Labrador
United States
 Newville, Alabama
 Newville, California
 Newville, Indiana
 Newville, New York
 Newville, Ohio
 Newville, Pennsylvania
 Newville, Bucks County, Pennsylvania
 Newville, Virginia
 Newville, West Virginia
 Newville, Wisconsin
 Newville Township, DeKalb County, Indiana

People with the surname
 Joshua A. Newville (born 1984), American lawyer

Lakes
 Newville Lake, Canada